Héctor Miguel Canteros (born 15 March 1989) is an Argentine football midfielder who currently plays for CSA, on loan from Argentine Primera División club Platense. He previously played for Vélez Sarsfield, Villarreal, Flamengo, Chapecoense and Ankaragücü.

Early life
Canteros was born and raised in Villa Pirelli, a shanty town of the City of Buenos Aires. He started playing youth football in Vélez Sársfield at the age of 10.

Career

Vélez Sarsfield
Canteros started his professional career for Vélez Sársfield on 8 February 2009, coming on as a substitute in his team's 0–0 draw with Independiente for the first fixture of the 2009 Clausura. He played only one more game in that tournament, the 8th fixture against Banfield, that his team went on to win.

During the 2011 Clausura, and due to Leandro Somoza's departure from Vélez, Canteros started playing more regularly for the first team. He scored his first professional goal in a 2–3 defeat to Quilmes.

In the beginning of 2014 Canteros' name was linked with Flamengo as a possible substitute for Elias, who was returning to Sporting CP as his loan finished. However, Canteros continued to play for Vélez Sarsfield, as Flamengo wanted a loan and the Argentine club was only willing to a permanent move.

Flamengo
On 3 July 3, 2014 Flamengo paid a fee of US$2.2 million for Canteros, and the player signed a 3-year contract. His debut for the new club came on 27 July in a 1–0 derby win against Botafogo at the Maracanã, as he came from the bench and played 27 minutes. Few days later, on 3 August, Héctor played his first match as a starter against Chapecoense at Arena Condá, which Flamengo lost 0–1.

Chapecoense (loan)
On 10 August 2017 Chapecoense sign Canteros on loan from Flamengo until May 31, 2018 to replace Andrei Girotto recently transferred to Nantes.

Chapecoense
As his contract with Flamengo and the loan to Chapecoense finished, on 31 May 2018 Canteros signed a six-month contract with Chapecoense until the end of the 2018 season.

Ankaragücü
On 31 January 2019, Canteros joined Süper Lig side Ankaragücü on a one and a half year deal.

Career statistics
(Correct .)

International appearances and goals

Honours
Vélez Sársfield
Argentine Primera División (2): 2009 Clausura, 2011 Clausura
Supercopa Argentina (1): 2013

References

External links
 
 
 Hector Canteros at Vélez Sársfield's official website 
 
 

Living people
1989 births
Footballers from Buenos Aires
Association football midfielders
Argentine footballers
Argentine expatriate footballers
Argentina international footballers
Argentine Primera División players
Segunda División players
Campeonato Brasileiro Série A players
Campeonato Brasileiro Série B players
Club Atlético Vélez Sarsfield footballers
Villarreal CF players
CR Flamengo footballers
Associação Chapecoense de Futebol players
MKE Ankaragücü footballers
Club Atlético Patronato footballers
Club Atlético Platense footballers
Centro Sportivo Alagoano players
Expatriate footballers in Brazil
Expatriate footballers in Spain
Argentine expatriate sportspeople in Brazil
Argentine expatriate sportspeople in Spain